Bear Branch is a stream in Linn
and Sullivan counties in the U.S. state of Missouri. It is a tributary of Bear Creek.

Bear Branch was named for the bears near its course.

See also
List of rivers of Missouri

References

Rivers of Linn County, Missouri
Rivers of Sullivan County, Missouri
Rivers of Missouri